This is a list of Methodist churches in the United States.  It includes notable churches either where a church means a congregation (in the New Testament definition) or where a church means a building (in the colloquial sense).  It also includes campgrounds and conference centers and retreats that are significant Methodist gathering places, including a number of historic sites of camp meetings.  This very limited list includes only historically or architecturally significant buildings, and omits many of the currently very largest and influential congregations which do not meet that standard.  Methodism was founded with a large component being a rejection of past churches and was developed by John Wesley and others in large open-air gatherings in Great Britain.  In the United States, Methodists (along with Baptists and other Protestants) were major participants in the Second Great Awakening wherein people would travel from a large area to a particular site to camp out, listen to itinerant preachers, and pray.  The list also includes selected notable Methodist theological buildings.

In the United States, numerous Methodist churches are listed on the National Register of Historic Places and on state and local historic registers, many reflecting the values of plainness, of Gothic architecture, of simple adornment.  The Greek Revival style is also simple and came to be adopted for numerous American Methodist churches.

Selected salient ones
Several, selected significant Methodist churches in the U.S. are:

Other U.S. significant Methodist churches:
(by state then city or town)

Alabama

Arizona

Arkansas

California

Colorado

Connecticut

Rockville United Methodist Church
142 Grove Street, Rockville, CT 06066

Delaware

District of Columbia

Florida

Georgia

Idaho

Illinois

Indiana

Iowa

Kansas

Kentucky

Louisiana

Maine

Maryland

Massachusetts

Michigan

Minnesota

Mississippi

Missouri

Montana

Nebraska

Nevada

New Hampshire

New Jersey

New Mexico

New York

North Carolina

Ebenezer United Methodist Church
Mount Holly, North Carolina

North Dakota

Ohio

Oklahoma

Oregon

Pennsylvania

Puerto Rico

Rhode Island

South Carolina

South Dakota

Tennessee

Texas

Utah

Vermont

Virginia

Washington

West Virginia

Wisconsin

Wyoming

See also
List of Methodist churches, worldwide
List of African Methodist Episcopal Churches

References

Methodist